Scott Jaeck (born October 29, 1954 in Milwaukee, Wisconsin) is an American actor. He attended New Trier High School in Winnetka, Illinois, graduating in 1973. He attended the University of Wisconsin–Milwaukee. He was married to actress Mariann Mayberry, a member of the Steppenwolf Theater Company ensemble in Chicago, Illinois, until her death on August 1, 2017.

His venture into soap operas lasted from 1987 to 1988, when he portrayed Cain Garver on Santa Barbara. He had recurring appearances on Charmed as Samuel Wilder and ER as Dr. Steven Flint. He appeared in "The Finale" episode of Seinfeld as an officer, and in episodes of two Star Trek spinoffs, Star Trek: The Next Generation and Star Trek: Voyager. He has appeared on Broadway in August: Osage County.

Regionally he has appeared at theaters including Milwaukee Repertory Theater, Pasadena Playhouse, Indiana Repertory Theatre, Alliance Theatre and The Shakespeare Theatre Company in Washington, D.C. Scott has also worked with the Royal Shakespeare Company at Stratford-upon-Avon.

Filmography

Film

Television

Theatre credits

Steppenwolf Theatre Company, Chicago 

Three Sisters (2012) .... Ivan Chebutykin (Downstairs Theatre)
Time Stands Still (2012) .... Richard Ehrlich (Upstairs Theatre)
Penelope (2011-2012) .... Dunne (Donwstairs Theatre)

Broadway, New York 

August: Osage County (2008-2009) .... Sheriff Deon Gilbeau (Roundabout Theatre Company), (play by Tracy Letts)

Goodman Theatre, Chicago 

Dinner with Friends (2003/2012) .... Gabe
Stage Kiss (2011) .... Husband/Harrison
Mary (2011) .... James Jennings
The Seagull (2010) ..... Yevgeniy Sergeyevich Dorn
Uncle Vanya
Galileo
A House Not Meant to Stand
The Night of the Iguana

Chicago Shakespeare Theatre 

Henry VIII (2013) .... Cardinal Wolsey (Courtyard Theater)
Twelfth Night (2009) .... Sir Toby Belch
Troilus and Cressida (2007) .... Agamemnon
Henry IV, Part 1 & Henry IV, Part 2
Much Ado About Nothing (2005-2006) .... Dogberry
The Merchant of Venice
The Merry Wives of Windsor
Julius Caesar (2002-2003) .... Marcus Antonius
The Tempest (2002) .... Caliban
Love's Labour's Lost (2002) .... Don Adriano de Armado
Richard II

Northlight Theatre, Illinois 

Inherit the Wind (2006) .... Henry Drummond
Red Herring (2006) .... Performer
How I Learned to Drive
Light Up the Sky

Other Stage Works 

Benefactors (2004) .... David (Writers' Theatre, Glencoe)
Our Town (2003) .... Mr. Webb (Writers' Theatre)
Someone Who'll Watch Over Me .... ??? (Victory Gardens Theater, Chicago)
Long Day's Journey into Night (1984) .... James Tyrone, Jr. (Court Theatre, Chicago)
The Irish Curse (2010) .... Father Kevin (Soho Playhouse, New York)
Inherit the Wind (2009) .... Henry Drummond (Cleveland Playhouse)
Tamburlaine (2007-2008) .... Performer (Sidney Harman Hall, Washington, DC)
Edward II (2007-2008) .... Archbishop of Canterbury (Sidney Harman Hall, Washington, DC)
The Normal Heart (Los Angeles Theatre)
Romeo & Juliet .... (Milwaukee Theatre)
Tribute (1979) .... Jud Templeton

References

External links
 
Opening Night of Arline Highway
Stage Kiss Play: Interview

1954 births
American male television actors
American male stage actors
Male actors from Milwaukee
Living people
University of Wisconsin–Milwaukee alumni